Fairytale Fights is a hack and slash action-adventure game developed by Playlogic Game Factory and published by Playlogic Entertainment for PlayStation 3 and Xbox 360.

Fairytale Fights allow the player a chance to reclaim the fairytale status of Little Red Riding Hood, Snow White, Jack, The Naked Emperor and more.

Gameplay 
Fairytale Fights is based on the Unreal Engine 3. The game has a volumetric liquid system, where blood drenches the surroundings when the player slice up the enemies multiple times in a frenzied attack. They are also able to slide through the pools of blood and melt their enemies using acid potions. Players have full control over how and when to slice their enemies, called dynamic slicing technology. The game features a multiplayer system for online and offline play, with drop-in-drop-out gameplay. Fairytale Fights features 140 weapons, and 3 difficulty levels.

Reception 
Fairytale Fights received mixed reviews, with a 51% average score on the Xbox 360 format on Metacritic. Some critics were more positive about it, such as Games Master magazine in the UK, which called it "a likeable, if slight, slice of gory Brothers Grimm gaming". However, many sources were considerably more scathing. IT Reviews said that "the dodgy controls combined with some awkward camera viewpoints, plus the overly repetitive levels, slowly sap much of the joy from the experience". GameSpot went further, criticising the game's lack of pacing, lousy boss fights and "shallow, repetitive combat".

A considerable number of glitches marred the Xbox 360 release in particular, leading to less than positive reviews before the much delayed patch was eventually released.  Until the game was patched, several achievements were unobtainable and multiplayer was severely affected, something which has now been remedied.

Andy Eddy of Team Xbox also added that Fairytale Fights's "annoyingly bad game design" held it back from being a better game. Eddy went on to say "Sadly, [Fairytale Fights] gimmicks aren’t strong enough to maintain the game across its entirety."

Awards 

Despite the mixed reviews across the web, Fairytale Fights won 2 Dutch Game Awards out of its 3 nominations during the 2010 Control Industry Award ceremony. Fairytale Fights was nominated for Best Audio Design, Best Visual Design and Best Console game of 2009–2010, taking home both the awards for Best Audio Design and Best Visual Design.

References

Notes

Footnotes 

2009 video games
Hack and slash games
Hydravision Entertainment games
Multiplayer and single-player video games
Playlogic Entertainment games
PlayStation 3 games
Unreal Engine games
Video games based on fairy tales
Video games developed in the Netherlands
Video games scored by Pedro Camacho
Works based on Snow White
Works based on The Emperor's New Clothes
Xbox 360 games